The Susa weddings was a mass wedding arranged by Alexander the Great in 324 BC in the Persian city of Susa.

Alexander intended to symbolically unite the Persian and Greek cultures, by taking a Persian wife himself and celebrating a mass wedding with Persian ceremony along with his officers, for whom he arranged marriages with noble Persian wives. The union was not merely symbolic, as their prospective offspring were intended to be the children of both civilizations.

Alexander was already married to Roxana, the daughter of a Bactrian chief, but Macedonian and Persian customs allowed several wives. Alexander himself married Stateira (sometimes called Barsine, but not to be confused with Barsine, wife of Memnon), the eldest daughter of Darius, and, according to Aristobulus, another wife in addition, Parysatis, the youngest daughter of Artaxerxes III. To Hephaestion he gave Drypetis; she too was the daughter of Darius, his own wife's sister, for he wanted Hephaestion's children to be his own nephews and nieces (This can also be linked to Alexander and Hephaestion's close relationship). To Seleucus he gave Apama, the daughter of Spitamenes the Bactrian, and likewise to the other Companions the daughters of the most notable Medes and Persians, eighty in all. Ptolemy I Soter married Artakama, daughter of Artabazus of Phrygia.

The weddings were solemnized in the Persian fashion: chairs were placed for the bridegrooms in order of precedence; after the toasts the brides entered and sat down each by her groom, who took them by the hand and kissed them. The king was the first to be married, for all the weddings were celebrated in the same manner, and in this ceremony he showed even more than his customary approachability and comradeship. 

. 

By marrying the daughters of Darius and Artaxerxes, Alexander was both identifying himself with the Persians and also making his own position more secure. He could now claim to be the son and rightful heir of both previous Persian kings. He also wanted to honour Hephaestion by making him his brother-in-law.

What the Macedonians thought of these marriages is evident from the fact that the nobles all divorced their wives after Alexander's death, except Hephaestion, who died before Alexander, and Seleucus. So in spite of Alexander's precedent, the Macedonians were no more inclined to share equally with the Persians than before.

See also
 Ariston (actor)

References 

Alexander the Great
Susa
4th century BC in Iran
Marriage in classical antiquity
Wedding
324 BC